Hasarius indularis is a jumping spider species in the genus Hasarius that lives on the Socotra Archipelago off the coast of the Yemen. The female was first described in 2002.

References

Salticidae
Spiders of Asia
Spiders described in 2002
Taxa named by Wanda Wesołowska
Endemic fauna of Socotra